The 1997 Grand Prix de Tennis de Lyon was a men's tennis tournament played on indoor carpet courts at the Palais des Sports de Gerland in Lyon, France, and was part of the World Series of the 1997 ATP Tour. It was the 11th edition of the tournament and took place from 13 October until 20 October 1997. Unseeded Fabrice Santoro won the singles title.

Finals

Singles

 Fabrice Santoro defeated  Tommy Haas 6–4, 6–4
 It was Santoro's only title of the year and the 2nd of his career.

Doubles

 Ellis Ferreira /  Patrick Galbraith defeated  Olivier Delaître /  Fabrice Santoro 3–6, 6–2, 6–4
 It was Ferreira's 5th title of the year and the 8th of his career. It was Galbraith's 5th title of the year and the 33rd of his career.

References

External links
 ITF tournament edition details

Grand Prix de Tennis de Lyon
1997
Grand Prix de Tennis de Lyon